was a pyramid scheme run by Ken'ichi Uchimura. Behind the Tenka Ikka no Kai was the Dai-ichi Sōgo Keizai Kenkyūsho, run by Uchimura. This organization, established in 1972, once had a million members. It was a cause of the enactment of Japan's law prohibiting pyramid schemes. In 1986 the  Dai-ichi Sōgo Keizai Kenkyūsho declared bankruptcy, leaving debts amounting to 189,600,000,000 yen. It has been called "the biggest pyramid scheme in history."

References

Pyramid and Ponzi schemes
Defunct companies of Japan
Japanese companies disestablished in 1986
Japanese companies established in 1972
Fraud in Japan